The Bon Secours Hospital, Tralee is a private hospital in County Kerry, Ireland. The hospital is part of Bon Secours Mercy Health. This includes sister hospitals in Cork, Dublin, Galway and Limerick.

History
The hospital in Tralee was established by the Bon Secours Sisters in 1921.

Services
The hospital provides 130 acute-care beds. Services provided include angiography, cardiology, bone densitometry, dietetics, diagnostic imaging, general medicine, intensive care medicine, general surgery, paediatrics, pharmacy, respiratory medicine, physiotherapy, and radiology.

Accreditation
The hospital received Joint Commission International accreditation in 2005.

References

Bon Secours Sisters
Hospital buildings completed in 1921
1921 establishments in Ireland
Hospitals in County Kerry
Hospitals established in 1921
Private hospitals in the Republic of Ireland